The Allison T78 was a turboprop engine that first ran in March 1965. It used a regenerator that recovered and reused exhaust heat to reduce fuel consumption.

Development

On February 21, 1963, the United States Navy mailed request for proposals to five engine companies to solicit bids for its regenerative turboprop engine (RTE) program. In July 1963, the U.S. Navy chose the Model 545-B2 from the Allison Division of General Motors for development as a regenerative turboprop engine. Allison was chosen instead of bids from Pratt & Whitney, General Electric, Curtiss-Wright, and Avco Lycoming. The engine was to be used for the aircraft carrier-based VSX airplane and a new version of the Lockheed P-3A Orion anti-submarine warfare (ASW) aircraft. It also had possible applications as an airborne early warning (AEW) aircraft or a patrol aircraft, and the U.S. Army studied variants of the engine to power its proposed heavy lift helicopter. The 545-B2 was given the U.S. military aircraft engine designation of T78. It was scheduled to complete the preliminary flight rating test (PFRT) by December 1966 and model qualification testing (MQT) by April 1968.

However, in March 1965 it was revealed that the Navy's request to fund development of the T78 for fiscal year 1965 had been rejected. In that month, the T78 had run for the first time, one month ahead of schedule. The T78 project was abandoned after about 350 hours of testing, because the Navy lacked a clear operational requirement for it.

Design

The engine had a regenerated design, which preheated the air that exited the compressor in a heat exchanger with hot air from the engine's exhaust before the compressed air entered the combustion chamber. The regenerator section formed a large ringlike duct surrounding the exhaust nozzle and contained about 4,500 tubes. Because of this design, the temperature of the compressed air entering the combustion chamber was several hundred degrees hotter than air from an equivalent non-regenerated engine. The design of the regenerator was provided by Garrett AiResearch. The regenerated engine was designed for possible new classes of military aircraft, which would be required to have the ability to stay airborne for three or more days at a time.

Variants

T78-A-2 Military turboprop variant.
545-B2 Internal designation for the baseline T78 turboprop. Chosen by the U.S. Navy in July 1963 to install on anti-submarine aircraft. Also drew U.S. Air Force interest as a high-endurance missile-launching aircraft.
545-C2 Front-drive regenerative turboshaft that has variable speed and constant turbine inlet temperature.
545-C3 Similar to the 545-C2 but has constant speed and variable turbine inlet temperature.
546-C2 Non-regenerative turboshaft that has variable speed and variable turbine inlet temperature.
546-C3 Similar to the 546-C2 but has constant speed.
548-C2 Rear-drive, non-regenerative, free-turbine turboshaft that has direct-drive and 3.22:1 reduction gearbox options.
548-D2 Regenerative version of the 548-C2.
548-RT Named for its remote turbine (RT) drive system, as it resembles the 548-C2 but without the free turbine.

Specifications (T78-A-2)

See also

References

Bibliography

External links
 T78-A-2 web page from the National Air and Space Museum

1960s turboprop engines
Allison aircraft engines
Abandoned military aircraft engine projects of the United States